Patrick Holden,  is a UK organic dairy farmer, campaigner for sustainable food and farming, and co-founder with Anthony Rodale of U.K. The Sustainable Food Trust and U.S. Sustainable Food Alliance. Holden features in regular broadcasts and talks at public events and is an active member in the food and farming community.

The seeds of his interest in farming were sown during his London childhood. Holden kept a variety of animals, ranging from mice and rabbits to budgerigars and myna birds, and would spend hours in his back garden studying the amphibians that migrated to the ponds he had dug as a boy. 

In 1971, aged 20, Holden spent a year in the San Francisco Bay Area where he was strongly influenced by the green movement that was gathering momentum at the time. As a result, Holden returned to the UK and worked for a year on an intensive dairy fam in Hampshire before studying biodynamic agriculture at Emerson College (UK).

Holden then joined the back-to-the-land movement in 1973 and, using the knowledge gained from his childhood, studies and experiences in California, formed a community farm in Bwlchwernen, Wales. After the community dispersed, Holden continued to run the farm now known as Holden Farm Dairy - now the longest established organic dairy farm in Wales. Enterprises have included an 80 cow Ayrshire herd, the milk from which goes to produce Hafod, a cheddar style cheese; oats and peas; wheat for flour milling; and carrots which he grew for supermarkets for 25 years.

Alongside farming, Holden’s other work has included the development of organic standards and the market for organic foods, founding British Organic Farmers, trustee of the Soil Association, and director of the Soil Association (1995-2010). He is also a patron of the UK Biodynamic Agricultural Association and The Living Land Trust, as well as an advisor and participant in the Prince of Wales Terra Carta initiative. 

In 2010, Holden founded the Sustainable Food Trust, an organisation based in Bristol, UK that works internationally to accelerate the transition towards more sustainable food systems. Key activities of the organisation include influencing government policy on sustainable agriculture; advocacy for true cost accounting; development of an internationally harmonised framework and metric for measuring on-farm sustainability; campaigning for the re-localisation of supply chains, including small abattoirs; and linking healthy diets to sustainable food production.

Honours
In the 2005 New Year Honours, Holden was appointed a Commander of the Order of the British Empire (CBE) "for services to organic farming".

On the 7th of July 2022, Holden received an honorary doctorate from the University of Wales Trinity Saint David.

References

Living people
21st-century British farmers
Organic farmers
Commanders of the Order of the British Empire
Year of birth missing (living people)
Dairy farmers